Brigadier General Francis Wanji Agwi, CSM, CBE, DSM (born ?) is a Papua New Guinean Army officer who served as the 9th Commander of the Papua New Guinea Defence Force.

On 26 January 2012, Brigadier General Agwi was briefly captured and held prisoner during the failed 2012 Defence Force mutiny at the Taurama army barracks. However, Agwi was soon freed and the leader of the mutiny, retired Colonel Yaura Sasa, was arrested two days later. Sasa and approximately 20 soldiers had staged the uprising to demand the reinstatement of former Prime Minister Michael Somare.

Agwi's term as commander of the PNGDF ended in December 2013, and he was replaced by Colonel Gilbert Toropo. In January 2014 Agwi was appointed PNG's High Commissioner to New Zealand.

See also
2011–2012 Papua New Guinean constitutional crisis

References

Year of birth missing (living people)
2011–2012 Papua New Guinean constitutional crisis
Commanders of the Papua New Guinea Defence Force
People from East Sepik Province
Living people
Papua New Guinean military personnel